Brian Smyth (born 1967) is an Irish figurative painter.

Brian or Bryan Smyth may also refer to:

Brian Smyth (Gaelic footballer) (1924–2016), Irish Gaelic footballer and hurler
Bryan Smyth (born 1963), Irish singer, television presenter and actor
Bryan Smyth (rugby league), rugby league footballer

See also
Brian Smith (disambiguation)
Bryan Smith (disambiguation)